Jonathan Bell Lovelace (1895–1979) was the founder of Capital Group Companies.

Early life
Jonathan Bell Lovelace was born in 1895. He grew up in Brewton, Alabama and attended Auburn University.

Career
Lovelace spent most of the 1920s at a Detroit banking/brokerage firm, developing his investment research techniques and earning impressive results. In 1924, he became a partner in E.E. MacCrone. By 1929, before the stock market crash, he could see no logical relationship between stock market prices and their underlying values, so he sold his interest in the firm, took his investments out of the market and moved to California.

Lovelace founded Capital Research and Management Company in 1931 which was at first a small firm named Lovelace, Dennis and Renfrew.

Personal life
His son, Jon B. Lovelace Jr., a Hotchkiss School 1944 graduate, served as an executive at Capital Group Companies. In 2007, his son and family were ranked #840 on the Forbes Billionaires List worth $1.1 billion. As of 2019, grandson Rob Lovelace serves as an investment manager for a Capital Group fund.

Death
He died in 1979.

References

1895 births
1979 deaths
20th-century American businesspeople
American financial company founders
American financiers
American investors
Auburn University alumni
Businesspeople from Alabama
Hotchkiss School alumni
People from Brewton, Alabama
Auburn Tigers football coaches